The Battipaglia–Metaponto railway is an Italian  long railway line, that connects Rome, Naples and Battipaglia with Potenza, Metaponto and Taranto. It is a commonly used trans-apennine linkage.

History

The line was opened in stages between 1863 and 1880.

In 1944 the deadliest accident in Italian railway history, the 8017 convoy Battipaglia-Potenza, happened on this line with over 500 victims.

Upgrades

Between 1986 and 1993 the railway was closed to allow for major works to upgrade the line, during which it was electrified. Electric trains however did not start using the line until 31 March 1994. In 1995 a service was launched using Eurostar ETR 450.

Usage
The line is used by the following service(s):

Intercity services Rome - Naples - Salerno - Potenza - Taranto
Regional services (Treno regionale) Naples - Salerno - Potenza - Metaponto - Taranto

References

Footnotes

Sources

See also 
 List of railway lines in Italy

Railway lines in Campania
Railway lines in Basilicata
Railway lines opened in 1863